Dead Man's Bluff or Zhmurki is a 2005 Russian black comedy/crime film.

Director Aleksei Balabanov, who directed Brother and Brother 2, uses cameo performances, by Russia's most prominent actors. The film depicts the anarchistic reality of the free-market streets of Russia in the beginning of 1990s, where the only real liberty was the freedom to kill.

Plot
The film opens with a professor lecturing a group of university students on the primitive accumulation of capital. The professor says: "Start-up capital is how everything begins - it makes it possible to start a business and multiply the initial investment many times over. The key question is how to get start-up capital..." By way of example, she begins to tell a story that supposedly took place a decade earlier during the socio-economic tumult in the aftermath of the collapse of the Soviet Union.

The movie flashes to Nizhniy Novgorod in the mid-1990s, to an interrogation scene that takes place in a morgue. The torturer continuously asks the gagged prisoner to talk, but it is unclear what the torturer desires to know. Before the torturer can start the interrogation, three masked men enter and threaten the torturer at gunpoint. A gunfight ensues and one of the masked men is killed as well as the prisoner and the torturer has been shot in the stomach. One of the masked men takes of his disguise and it is revealed that he is a police officer named Stepan. The following events make it clear that he is a crooked officer. He asks the torturer what information someone called "Mikhailovich" wanted from the prisoner and when the torturer gives him a finger, Stepan shoots the man in the head and then shoots his own partner. The officer takes a piece of paper from the torturers pocket and seems excited by what he reads on it.

The movie then introduces the audience to three new gangsters. Standing around and smoking cigarettes, the trio discusses their current lack of "jobs" due to one of them, Bala, being unprofessional and turning the "operation" into a bloodbath with 5 murders, thus throwing a shadow over their group. The two Russian looking men in this group, its leader Koron and one of his henchmen, Bala, consistently make their black partner, Baklazhan ("Eggplant"), the butt of their jokes—even though he was born in Russia, the other two seemingly refuse to accept he is a Russian and insist on calling him the Ethiopian. The trio get a phone call from the crooked cop, Stepan, who offers them a "job". They decide to meet at the zoo tomorrow to discuss the details.

The movie jumps to the protagonists, Semen (nicknaming himself "Simon") and Sergei, who are two young hoodlums working for Sergei Mikhailovich, a local mob boss. Throughout the entire film, Sergei is seen carrying around a leather folder, which he seemingly instinctively holds before him in moments of danger when he can't use his gun. Sergei Mikhailovich wears a magenta sports coat and uses a cell phone with an extendable antenna, a symbol of prosperity at that time. Upon learning that a chemist nicknamed "Doctor" has established a makeshift drug lab in the neighborhood, Sergei Mikhailovich sends Simon and Sergei to persuade Doctor to start paying him protection money. Sergei appears to be the smarter of the two hoods, doing all the talking. Simon is more taciturn: a ruthless killer with spring-loaded guns hidden in the wide sleeves of his trench coat. After Sergei explains why they are there, Doctor scoffs at them and before they can do anything, two of Doctor's associates appear. In the ensuing shoot-out, Sergei and Simon kill both the Doctor and his associates, but decide to take the fresh-made drugs in a box with them to soften Mikhailovich's fury on failing their task.

Sergei's plan works: although furious, Mikhailovich decides to give the duo another chance to make good. He tells Sergei and Simon to drive to the house of an attorney and exchange a suitcase full of money for a suitcase full of heroin. The two drive to a bar restaurant to relax and discuss the job. Unknown to the duo, a crooked cop named Stepan who learnt about this deal from the first scene. He hires Koron and his two associates, Bala and Baklazhan to intercept Sergei and Simon, promising them part of the money in the suitcase. The gangsters, wearing masks, hold up Sergei and Simon after the exchange took place and take the suitcase from them at gunpoint (strictly following Stepan's instructions and thinking that the suitcase is full of money).

Sergei suspects their fate is grim, especially when he learns Mikhailovich burned his hired architect in the new-built faulty fireplace earlier this day, but instead Sergei Mikhailovich, learning of the state of affairs and quickly rooting out the rat while they were on the way, orders them to find Stepan, discover where the drugs were taken, and then kill him. The duo drive to Stepan's apartment, meet him at the way home, come with him to his apartment, bind him, and begin to brutally torture him. Before long, Stepan tells them where to find the three gangsters who held them up. After that, Simon kills Stepan.

Using the information extracted from Stepan, Sergei and Simon drive to Koron's apartment, but find that Baklazhan is the only person there. Koron had left earlier to try to find Stepan and clear things about suitcase contents, while Bala stepped out to buy some cigarettes. Sergei and Simon overpower and tie up Baklazhan. He swears that he has no idea who they are or what they are talking about. Sergei begins to search the apartment for the heroin, while Simon loads up vinyl record he found into a player. Sergei finds a bag filled with guns (also, a portable missile launcher and some grenades, bought by Baklazhan as per Koron's order to "get some silenced guns and something heavier", meaning an assault rifle) and three robber's masks in the closet. Still, Baklazhan denies everything even under torture with broken limb and clearly in constant pain. A neighbor bothered by the loud music comes calling and attempts to threaten Simon, ending being locked in a tight closed and receiving two bullets.

Soon, a group of gangsters led by a criminal named Mozg (The Brain) show up at the apartment. They were a second group that Stepan hired to deal with the Koron's trio and get him the suitcase for free (since Mozg's payment was information about Koron's location and a chance for a payback for something in their past). The duo shoots them, wounding Mozg and killing the rest. Mozg, tied up for interrogation, begins to threaten them and Sergei kills him with a sudden shot to the temple. Soon after, Koron and Bala return to the apartment. Sergei and Simon tie them up and, under the smallest pressure with a threat of torture and a promise of a "chance", Koron gives up the location of the heroin suitcase, hidden in the oven. Baklazhan raises his eyes upwards in disapproval and despair.

Then comes the "chance" Sergei promised: a round of Russian Roulette for each of the trio, which he calls "Zhmurki" ("blind man's buff"—thus, the title of the film), motivating naming of the game with a wordplay on "Zhmur", a dead person (this word itself originates from the verb "Zazhmurit'sa", "shut the eyes", which in crime jargon stands for "going stiff"). He "demonstrates" the game principle by loading a bullet and then pulling the trigger while aiming at each of his prisoner's legs, which ends in Baklazhan getting the bullet to a hip. One by one they are led to the kitchen to play. Koron ends up killing himself after asking the duo to just let him go. Bala goes into a verbal rage, accusing Sergei of cowardice and demanding he plays, too. Sergei agrees, but he puts his folder between his temple and the gun and quickly pressing the trigger. After that Bala, clearly in fear, pushes the trigger on himself, resulting in another shot. Then Simon asks to "just kill the negr" (note that "negr" in Russian culture isn't same as "nigger" and doesn't carry any negative tone to it) because "he doesn't like them" and Sergei approves. Meanwhile, Baklazhan, despite his multiple wounds, has freed himself from the ropes and has gotten a hold of a gun. Since he can't move, he holds an ambush position at the table he was tortured next to and shoots Sergei as the duo returns from the kitchen, wounding him in the stomach. Simon quickly reacts and kills Baklazhan.

The following series of events is an excellent example of black humor within this film. As Sergei lays bleeding on the couch approaching death and lamenting it was the only time he forgot his folder, Simon is lazily and slowly searching through his phonebook and eventually calls a friend who is a medical student (since they can't go to a hospital with a gunshot wound and several pounds of heroin). The friend, clad in punk attire and a colored mohawk, comes over and, after spending an ample amount of time chatting with Simon, takes a hit of cocaine, and pulls out a medical textbook. As his operation begins, it is clear that he has never done this sort of procedure before as he is forced to use the textbook as a guide. While his friend is operating, Simon opens Sergei's leather folder and discovers a thick metal plate inside. When Sergei gets some air and attempts to sit, Simon suggests they move out, "because who knows who'll come next and he's almost out of bullets".

After the bloodbath at Koron's apartment, Sergei and Simon decide that they could do much better for themselves in Moscow and there was little upside to continuing to work for Sergei Mikhailovich. Deciding to act on an offer from a former colleague from earlier in the movie, Simon and Sergei get out of town taking the heroin with them using it as their "start-up capital".

The film then flashes forward to 2005. The film ends ironically as instead of continuing their lives as thugs as the audience expected, Sergei and Simon have become respected members of the Russian Parliament. The duo own a securities trading firm. Sergei Mikhalovich, their old mob boss, now works for them as a security guard.

Production
Approximately 50 liters of fake blood were used in the film. With the exception of a few scenes in Moscow, the film was shot in Tver, the city formerly known as Kalinin, and Nizhny Novgorod, the city known as Gorky in Soviet times.

Reception
This film is a first attempt at a comedic movie by Balabanov. The movie serves as a dark humor farce on typical gangster movies that were prevalent within Russian society in the 1990s. The movie received mixed reviews, with some critics writing disparaging reviews stating that the plot left much to be desired and most of the jokes fell flat, while others argued that the movie was a successful attempt by Balabanov to add a new movie genre to his repertoire.

Literature
Florian Weinhold (2013), Path of Blood: The Post-Soviet Gangster, His Mistress and Their Others in Aleksei Balabanov's Genre Films, Reaverlands Books: North Charleston, SC: pp. 115–138.

Cast 
 Nikita Mikhalkov as Sergei Mikhailovich
 Dmitriy Dyuzhev as Simon 
 Aleksei Panin as Sergei
 Sergey Makovetskiy as Koron 
 Viktor Sukhorukov	as Stepan  
 Anatoly Zhuravlyov as Bala 
 Grigory Siyatvinda as Eggplant 
 Aleksei Serebryakov as Doctor 
 Garik Sukachov as Brain 
 Andrey Panin as Architector
 Kirill Pirogov as Executioner 
 Yuriy Stepanov  as Kaban 
 Renata Litvinova as Waitress/Secretary Katya
 Zhanna Bolotova as University Professor
 Tatyana Dogileva as Galya/Lawyer's Secretary
 Andrey Krasko as Neighbour disturbed by the loud music
 Alexandr Bashirov as Man tied to the chair
 Andrey Merzlikin as Security guard
 Viktor Bychkov as Boy's father in zoo
 Sergey Glazunov as Leshik (medicine student)
 Vladislav Tolochko as Vladik
 Yevgeny Kosyrev as Grown-up Vladik
 Dmitry Pevtsov as Lawyer Borschansky
 Oleg Osaenko as Madman with a gun

References

External links

Trailer and Screenshots

2005 films
Russian black comedy films
Russian action comedy films
2000s Russian-language films
Films about the Russian Mafia
Films directed by Aleksei Balabanov
Films set in 1995
Films set in 2005
Films set in Moscow
Films set in Nizhny Novgorod
Films shot in Moscow
Films shot in Nizhny Novgorod
Russian crime comedy films
Russian comedy thriller films